Econocom Group SE is a European provider of business-to-business digital services. It was founded in 1974 by Jean-Louis Bouchard as Europe Computer Systèmes (ECS).

History of the group

Inception and early years
1974: Jean-Louis Bouchard founds the group under the name Europe Computer Systèmes (ECS) in France.

1986: Jean-Louis Bouchard sells his stake in ECS France to Société Générale but buys back all the foreign subsidiaries and merges them with Econocom, an American SMB he had recently taken over. The subsidiaries and group are renamed "Econocom".

1986: Econocom Belgium is listed on the secondary market of the Brussels stock exchange.

1993: Acquires Asystel Belgium, making Econocom Distribution the leading IT distributor in the Benelux.

International expansion
1996: Econocom is listed on the primary market of the Brussels stock exchange.

2000: Econocom is listed on the secondary market of the Paris stock exchange. The group diversifies by setting up Econocom Telecom.

2000:  Exchange offer for Infopoint.

2001: The group employs 2000 people.

2002:  Acquires Comdisco-Promodata in France (administrative and financial IT asset management).

2004: Acquires Signal Service France.

2005: The group concentrates its business in 5 European countries: Belgium, France, the Netherlands, Spain and Italy. Econocom sells off its Swiss subsidiary and closes its financing operations in the United States.

2006: Branches into telecoms by acquiring Avenir Telecom’s business division.

2007: Expands its telecoms division and acquires the Carphone Warehouse France’s "Business" division. The group doubles its sales force in Italy by acquiring Tecnolease, an Italian IT leasing company.

2008: Acquires Databail, a French IT infrastructure funding company.

2009: Opens a nearshore remote service facility in Rabat, Morocco, which employs 300 multilingual staff.

October 2010: Société Générale sells ECS: Jean-Louis Bouchard buys back the company he set up over thirty-five years before and merges it with Econocom.

2010: Launches "7 Remote Services", an enterprise solution designed to assist companies in migrating their IT estate to Microsoft’s latest operating system.

2011: Véronique di Benedetto, former Deputy Managing Director of ECS, is appointed Deputy Managing Director of the new group and Managing Director of Econocom France. A graduate of ESCP who began her career as an Account Manager at IBM, Véronique joins the management board, chaired by Jean-Louis Bouchard, along with Jean-Phillippe Roesch and Bruno Lemaistre.

2012: Econocom continues its expansion in the virtualisation sector by acquiring Ermestel, a pioneer in the Spanish market, and acquiring a stake in Centix, a Belgian company specialising in cloud computing solutions.

2012: Acquires Tactem, a provider of telecom expense management solutions.

2012: Acquires France Systèmes, France’s leading Apple reseller in the education and research sector, and enhances its IT security offering by buying Cap Synergy, a French systems integrator specialising in network and IT system security.

2013: Econocom buys out French systems integrator Exaprobe, thus expanding its security, network and communications division, now worth €30 million in revenue.

2013: Econocom announces its new strategic plan MUTATION 2013 – 2017

2013: On 12 September 2013, Econocom finalises the acquisition of a majority stake in Osiatis, a major infrastructure service provider and related applications specialist.  This transaction has resulted in the creation of a major new digital service company, with over 8,000 employees in 20 countries and total revenue of around €2 billion.

2013: in October, Jean-Maurice Fritsch and Bruno Grossi, co-chairmen of the Osiatis Management Board, have joined the Econocom Executive Board.

2013: Econocom Group unveils its new visual identity and adopts a new branding system.

2013: In November, successful friendly public offer by Econocom on Osiatis. On 22 November 2013, Econocom finalises the acquisition of the entire share capital of Osiatis.

2014: Georges Croix and Econocom join forces to create Digital Dimension, a cloud and digital solutions provider.

2017: Econocom continues its involvement in EdTech by investing in the venture capital firm Educapital

2017: Econocom and Microsoft are announcing a partnership to distribute Hololens on the European market

2018: Robert Bouchard takes over as CEO of the Econocom Group.

2018: Louise Beveridge joins Econocom as Head of Brand

2018: Econocom strengthens its retail offering by acquiring a majority stake in altabox, a spanish "leader in the development of omnichannel marketing strategies"

2018: Econocom presents e-vigilante, its new robot for monitoring industrial sites.

History of the brand and logo

Today
Econocom currently employs 10,700 people, has 40 years’ experience and 7.0 million digital assets managed. At the end of 2012, the group established itself in the smart solutions market by setting up a research and development programme with Istituto Superiore Mario Boella in Turin, Italy.

Business sectors
The group’s three areas of business are:
Technology management & financing
IT & Telecom Services
Products and Solutions

International operations
Econocom has operations in 20 countries. In 2013, the group’s main markets were:
Northern and Eastern Europe: 10% of total revenue
France: 51% of total revenue
Benelux: 19% of total revenue
Southern Europe: 20% of total revenue

References

Online companies of Belgium
Companies based in Brussels